Jonathan Hellström (born 9 August 1988) is a Swedish footballer who plays for Sandvikens IF as a midfielder.

References

External links

1988 births
Living people
Association football defenders
Gefle IF players
Allsvenskan players
Swedish footballers